Arthur Benjamin (1893–1960) was an Australian composer.

Arthur Benjamin may also refer to:

Arthur T. Benjamin (born 1961), American mathematician

See also

Arthur Benjamins (born 1953), Dutch artist